Whitefish Bay, Ontario may refer to one of two First Nations in Canada:

Lac Seul First Nation near Sioux Lookout
Naotkamegwanning First Nation near Sioux Narrows